František Neuwirt (26 August 1895 – 15 August 1957), was a member of the Czechoslovak Academy of Sciences, specialising in stomatology.

He followed Jan Jesenský as head of the Prague Stomatology Clinic until his death, was a member of the Bohemian Academy, a member of International Association for Dental Research (IADR), whose Honorary Vice-President he became in 1939–1940, and co-founder of its Prague Section in 1932.

He had a daughter, Hana, a historian at the Charles University and a son, Jan, a hematologist and researcher at Charles University.

His sister Rosalie was the wife of Vladimír Jiří Rott, Prague entrepreneur. František Neuwirt had his private general practice at their premises on Malé náměstí and was one of the frequent guests at their "Thursdays", where Prague and international society met.

References

 František Neuwirt: Jan Jesenský, nakladatelství České akademie věd a umění, Prague 1948

1895 births
1957 deaths
Academic staff of Charles University